Ashley Phillips may refer to:

 Ashley Phillips (footballer, born 1986), American women's soccer goalkeeper
 Ashley Phillips (footballer, born 2005), English football centre-back